Kamarkundu is a village in Kamarkundu Gopalnagar gram panchayat in Singur block in Chandannagore subdivision of Hooghly district in the Indian state of West Bengal.

Geography
Kamarkundu is located at 

This is a rich agricultural area with several cold storages.

Economy
Around a total of 32 lakh people from all around the city commute to Kolkata daily for work. In the Howrah-Tarakeswar section there are 48 trains that carry commuters from 21 railway stations. In the Howrah-Bardhaman (chord line) section 48 trains carry commuters from 30 railway stations.

Transport
At Kamarkundu railway station, the Sheoraphuli-Bishnupur branch line goes above the Howrah-Bardhaman chord. Since the lines are at two levels, trains cannot switch routes. Platforms are at two levels.

External links
   Map of Hooghly district

References

Villages in Hooghly district